Greg Ballora (born 1965, and also known as Gregory Ballora, Gregory B. Ballora and Gregory Bellora) is an American puppeteer.

Filmography

Film
 Men in Black II – Sleeble
 The Muppets – Additional Muppets
 The X-Files – Creature #2

Television
 Bizaardvark – Hair Puppeteer (in "Pretty Con")
 Greg the Bunny – Various
 Muppets Tonight – Additional Muppets
 The Adventures of Timmy the Tooth – Emmett the Mailbox, Various
 The Crayon Box - Puppeteer 
 The Mr. Potato Head Show – Baloney

Crew work
 Billy & Mandy's Big Boogie Adventure – Grim (puppeteer)
 Crash & Bernstein – Puppet Captain
 RoboCop 2 – Robot Monster Crew (movement)
 Team America: World Police – Lead Puppeteer
 The Flintstones – Puppeteer

External links
 

American puppeteers
Living people
1965 births
Date of birth missing (living people)
Place of birth missing (living people)